Radi Hassan Annab (23 July 1897 – 12 September 1993) was the first Arab commander of the Arab Legion when it concurrently became the Jordanian Armed Forces.

Biography

Radi Annab was born on 23 July 1897 in Nablus, then part of the Ottoman Empire. His father was Hajj Hassan Annab, an officer of the Ottoman Army. Annab's father instilled in him the values of military service, discipline and professionalism. Although Annab, like his father, enlisted in the Ottoman army, he later defected to join Sharif Hussein's British-backed Arab Revolt against the Ottomans in 1916. In 1923, Annab was among the Arab officers who formed the core of the British-led Arab Legion of the Emirate of Transjordan, which was ostensibly ruled by Sharif Hussein's son, Emir Abdullah I. Annab  was the chief of police for the Balqa District in 1930, as well as the Arab Legion's chief of public security. In 1937, he was assigned chief of police of Karak District, before being reassigned to Balqa the following year. In 1941, Annab was reassigned chief of public security and then posted as the chief of police in Amman and Ajloun in 1943 and 1944, respectively.

As the Jerusalem District's police chief, Annab was present with King Abdullah I during the latter's assassination at the al-Aqsa Mosque in Jerusalem by a Palestinian shooter opposed to the king's policies. In the ensuing firefight with the shooter, who was shot dead, Annab was wounded. On 29 June 1953, Annab met with Israeli general Moshe Dayan where they discussed ways to put an end to attempts by Palestinian refugees to infiltrate into the Israeli side of the Green Line, a cause of consternation for Israel.

The Jordanian Armed Forces was formed on 1 March 1956 out of the Arab Legion. King Hussein, at the time, sought to distance himself from Jordan's former colonial power, the British, and disprove the contention of Arab nationalists that Glubb Pasha, the Arab Legion's commander, was the actual ruler of Jordan. Hussein Arabized the Army command, and Glubb was dismissed on the same date and replaced with Annab, who became the Arab Legion's first Arab commander. Prior to his appointment, Annab had only held police posts. Annab retired two months later, on 24 May 1956, and was succeeded by Major Colonel Ali Abu Nuwar. During his lifetime, he was decorated with Jordan's Medal of Independence and Order of the Renaissance.

He died on 12 September 1993 in Amman, Jordan.

Awards
  Order of Independence
  Supreme Order of the Renaissance

References

Bibliography

1897 births
1993 deaths
People from Nablus
Arabs in Ottoman Palestine
Jordanian generals
Jordanian people of Palestinian descent